Joseph Leonard Schaffer (October 14, 1937 – September 25, 2017) was an American football player who played with the Buffalo Bills. He played college football at the University of Tennessee.

References

1937 births
2017 deaths
American football linebackers
Tennessee Volunteers football players
Buffalo Bills players
Players of American football from Cincinnati
American Football League players
Elder High School alumni